Inside Out is the second live album by American rock band Bon Jovi, and was released on November 27, 2012. It includes songs from shows at O2 Arena, New Meadowlands Stadium, and Madison Square Garden, recorded during the band's Lost Highway Tour in 2008 and the Circle Tour in 2010.

Release
The album was first shown at movie theaters, with screenings preceded by a question-and-answer session with Jon Bon Jovi, Richie Sambora, David Bryan and Tico Torres streamed live from a theater in New York, and was subsequently made available for purchase on iTunes.

Track listing

Personnel
Jon Bon Jovi - lead vocals, guitar
Richie Sambora - lead guitar, backing vocals, talkbox
Tico Torres - drums, percussion
David Bryan - keyboards, backing vocals

Additional personnel
 Hugh McDonald - bass, backing vocals
Bobby Bandiera - rhythm guitar, backing vocals
Lorenza Ponce - violin, backing vocals

Charts and certifications

Weekly charts

References

Bon Jovi live albums
Albums produced by Richie Sambora
Albums produced by Desmond Child
Albums produced by John Shanks
2012 live albums
2012 compilation albums